Statistics of Latvian Higher League in the 1944 season.

Overview
It was not completed because of the Red Army attack.

League standings

References
RSSSF

1944
Higher League
Latvia